Rumpole and the Age of Miracles is a 1988 collection of short stories by John Mortimer about defence barrister Horace Rumpole. They were adapted from his scripts for the TV series of the same name.
The stories were:
"Rumpole and Portia"
"Rumpole and the Age of Miracles"
"Rumpole and the Barrow Boy" 
"Rumpole and the Bubble Reputation"
"Rumpole and the Chambers Party"
"Rumpole and the Quality of Life"
"Rumpole and the Tap End"

References

Works by John Mortimer
1988 short story collections